Panai Kusui (born 1969) is a Taiwanese singer-songwriter, guitarist and social activist. Her parents are of the Puyuma and Amis tribes of southeastern Taiwan.

Debut
Panai's first album "ni-wa-wa" was released in 2000 and received an award as one of the top 10 albums of the year by the China Times.

Activism
Panai supported Democratic Progressive Party candidate Tsai Ing-wen in the 2016 Taiwanese presidential election campaign, voicing her support for Tsai, whose grandmother was Paiwan. Panai sang aboriginal songs at Tsai's campaign rallies and post-election victory events, including Tsai's investiture. Panai, at these events, voiced the need of formal apologies to aboriginal peoples for past abuses. Elected president, Tsai fulfilled these requests and presented formal apologies to aboriginal populations.

In February 2017, Tsai Ingwen's government declared a series of public lands as aboriginal ancestral territories. Panai denounced the moves as insufficient since it did not returns lands previously taken and now owned by private entities, including notorious mines. Panai's objection was based on 2 principles: the right of surviving aboriginal tribes to get back their whole territories, and the request for autonomy consistent enough so aboriginal community could negotiate as equals with the government. Panai was one of the leaders of the Indigenous Ketagalan Boulevard Protest concerning the delineation of traditional lands of Taiwanese aborigines. On February 23, she occupied using tents the grass ground facing the Presidential Office Building, but was moved out 100 days later, installing herself near a metro entrance, and after 600 (January 2019) had to move again to a nearby park. As of early 2020, Panai and her husband are still protesting there.

Discography
 ni-wa-wa (泥娃娃) — 2000, TCM
 泥娃娃  Ni Wa-Wa
 不要不要討好 Me Myself
 流浪記 Wandering
 浮沈 Floating, Sinking
 捆綁 Tied Up in Knots
 大武山美麗的媽媽 My Beautiful Mother, Da-Wu Mountain
 過日子 Sometimes
 失去你 Gone is Gone
 天堂 Heaven
 你知道你自己是誰嗎 Do You Know Who You Are?
 怎會會這樣 Why？
 每一天 Every Day's Dream

 Pur-dur & Panai Unplugged Live  — 2001, TCM
 I'm Happy Because You're Happy
 Ho-ai-yE-yan
 Tied Up in Knots
 Talking
 Why?
 Rice Wine
 My Beautiful Mother, Da-Wu Mountain
 Memories of Orchid Island
 Talking
 Yi-na-pa-yiu-ddia
 Talking
 MuMu's Blue
 Rain and You
 Relaxed and Happy
 Ho-yi-na-lu-wan
 Tai-ba-lang Folksong

 A Piece of Blue
 海歸 (Sea return)
 媽媽請你不要放心 (Don't worry mama)
 我 (Me)
 Talaluki
 我和自己 (Me and myself)
 看到你的臉 (When I see your face)
 愛!愛!愛! (Love you!)
 飄 (Drifting)
 停在那片藍 (A piece of blue)
 Afternoon

References

External links

Panai website

Taiwanese singer-songwriters
1969 births
Living people
Puyuma people
Amis people